The 2018–19 Liberty Lady Flames basketball team represents Liberty University during the 2018–19 NCAA Division I women's basketball season. The Eagles, led by twentieth-year head coach Carey Green, play their home games at the Vines Center and were first year members of the Atlantic Sun Conference. They finished the season 16–16, 10–6 in A-Sun play to finish in a tie for third place. They advanced to the championship game of the A-Sun Tournament where they lost to Florida Gulf Coast.

Roster

Schedule

|-
!colspan=9 style=| Non-conference Regular season

|-
!colspan=9 style=| Atlantic Sun Regular Season

|-
!colspan=9 style=| Atlantic Sun Women's Tournament

See also
2018–19 Liberty Flames basketball team

References

Liberty
Liberty Lady Flames basketball seasons